is a studio album by Kessoku Band, a fictional musical group from the anime television series Bocchi the Rock!. Aniplex released the album digitally on December 25, 2022, and physically on CD on December 28.

Background and release
Kessoku Band is a fictional musical group in the manga series Bocchi the Rock!. In the anime adaptation of the manga, Yoshino Aoyama, Sayumi Suzushiro, Saku Mizuno, and Ikumi Hasegawa provided the voices for Kessoku Band's members Hitori Gotō, Nijika Ijichi, Ryō Yamada, and Ikuyo Kita, respectively. After the airing of the fifth episode, it was announced that the group will release a self-titled album, consisting of 14 tracks including those featured in the anime series. The musicians in charge of Kessoku Band, Osamu Hidai (drums), Yūichi Takama (bass guitar),  (guitar) and Ritsuo Mitsui (guitar), were selected by music director Gen Okamura through personal connections, with Hasegawa performing the vocals for most of the songs.

"Secret Base", "I Can't Sing a Love Song", "The Little Sea", and "Flashbacker" are newly recorded songs for the album, while "Rockn' Roll, Morning Light Falls on You" is a cover of the Asian Kung-Fu Generation song of the same name, and served as the ending song of the anime's twelfth and final episode.

Nine songs debuted online prior to the album's physical release: "Seishun Complex" and "Distortion!!" on October 9, 2022; "Karakara" on October 30; "Guitar, Loneliness and Blue Planet" on November 6; "That Band" and "What Is Wrong With" on November 27; and "Never Forget", "If I Could Be a Constellation", and "Rockn' Roll, Morning Light Falls on You" on December 25. Kessoku Band was released digitally on December 25, 2022, and physically on CD on December 28. A limited edition of the CD included a Blu-ray containing the opening and ending sequences of the anime series.

Critical reception
In a review for Mikiki, Shi called Kessoku Band "a truly exceptional piece of music that does not get stuck in the usual 'anime song style'". The reviewer stated that the album is in the vein of Japanese rock music, and that the "metal-like" lead guitar creates a unique structure that "did not seem to exist at the time of the 2000s and 2010s". Shi praised the vocals, particularly of Hasegawa and Aoyama, and the album's cohesiveness, but described the transition from the beginning to middle as "rough".

Commercial performance
Kessoku Band debuted at number one on Billboard Japans Download Albums chart dated December 28, 2022, with 5,877 downloads during the period dated December 19–25, as well as the Top Albums Sales chart, with 73,244 sales recorded during the period dated December 26, 2022 to January 1, 2023. The album also entered the Hot Albums chart dated December 28 at number six, but rose to number one the following week. For Oricon's charts dated January 9, 2023, the album simultaneously topped the Albums Chart, Combined Albums Chart, and Digital Albums Chart. Kessoku Band remained at number one in the Digital Albums Chart for four consecutive weeks, marking the first time a female group achieved that record. The album was certified gold by the Recording Industry Association of Japan for reaching 100,000 physical sales.

Track listing
Credits adapted from Tidal and the album's liner notes.

Personnel
Credits adapted from Tidal and the album's liner notes.

Fictional line-up
 Ikuyo Kita – vocals, rhythm guitar
 Hitori Gotō – lead guitar, lyrics; vocals (track 14)
 Ryō Yamada – bass guitar, composition; vocals (track 8)
 Nijika Ijichi – drums; vocals (track 10)

Musicians

 Osamu Hidai – drums
 Yūichi Takama – bass guitar
  – guitar, arrangement
 Ritsuo Mitsui – guitar, arrangement

Technical

 Gen Okamura – director
 Gendam – recording, mixing
 Yūji Kamijō – recording
 Mitsuyasu Abe – mastering
  – production
 Ken Kobayashi – production cooperation
 Shunsuke Arai – production cooperation
 Naomi Kobayashi – production cooperation
 Yūji Kimura – production cooperation
 Keigo Mikami – production cooperation
 Yōko Shimane – production cooperation
 Kōhei Yamada – production cooperation

Design

 Kerorira – key frame
 Asuka Yokota – coloring
 Tsubasa Kanamori – photography
 Yasunao Moriyasu – background
 Tomoyuki Uchikoga – product design

Charts

Weekly charts

Monthly charts

Certifications

References

External links
  
 

2022 debut albums
Anime soundtracks
Aniplex
Japanese-language albums